Woof may refer to:

 Woof (sound), a sound made by a dog usually called a "bark"
 Weft in weaving, the threads that run from side to side on a loom

Music
 Woof (label), a record label
 "Woof" (song), by Snoop Dogg, 1998
 Woofer, a loudspeaker driver that produces low-frequency sounds
 WOOF (AM), a radio station (560 AM) in Dothan, Alabama, United States
 WOOF-FM, a radio station (99.7 FM) in Dothan

People
 Barbara Woof (born 1958), Australian-Dutch composer and music educator
 Emily Woof (born 1967), English actress and author
 Maija Woof, more commonly known as Maija Peeples-Bright (born 1942), Latvian-born American and Canadian artist
 Robert Woof (politician) (1911–1997), British Labour Party politician and Member of Parliament
 Robert Woof (scholar) (1931-2005), English academic, father of Emily Woof
 Rowsby Woof (1883-1943), English violinist and music educator

Other uses
 Woof (software), a build script for Puppy Linux
 Woof (Pillow Pal), a Pillow Pal dog made by Ty, Inc.
 Woof!, a 1980s/1990s British children's television series
 Seawolf (fish), marketed in Britain as Woof
 DoggoLingo or woof, an internet language of words used to refer to dogs
 Petco (Nasdaq: WOOF), an American retailer of pet products and services

See also
 WWOOF, Worldwide Opportunities on Organic Farms
 WUPHF.com, an episode of the American television show The Office